Mignonette may refer to:

Plants 
 Mignonette or Reseda (plant), a genus of fragrant herbaceous plants
 Cultivars of butterhead-type lettuce (Lactuca sativa var. capitata),  such as 'Green mignonette' and 'Red mignonette'
 Mignonette tree, also called henna
 Mignonette vine, Anredera cordifolia

Art, entertainment, and media
 Amelia Mignonette Grimaldi Thermopolis Renaldo, a character in The Princess Diaries
Mignonette (album), a 2004 folk album by The Avett Brothers
Mignonette Kokin (1880-1957), vaudeville dancer and comedian
Mignonette, an 1874 comic opera by Blanche Reeves and Jesse Williams commissioned by Alice Oates

In cooking 
 Mignonette or poivre mignonette, roughly cracked or coarsely ground peppercorns in French cuisine, used for au poivre preparations and in bouquet garni
 Mignonette sauce, a sauce of vinegar and shallots, typically used for oysters

Ships
 , built 1867, shipwrecked in 1884; cannibalism as a necessity defense for murdering crewmember Richard Parker was struck down by R v Dudley and Stephens to set an enduring legal precedent 
 , more than one ship of the British Royal Navy
 , a steam operated tugboat

Other uses
 Mignonette (locomotive), a locomotive of the Great Western Railway
Mignonette, a type of nineteenth century lace made in Arras
 Réséda, Mignonette day in the French Republican Calendar